Sir Frederick Adam (1781–1853) was a Scottish general.

Frederic(k) Adam may also refer to:

Frédéric Adam, musician
Fred Adam, player in 1922 National Intercollegiate Basketball Tournament
Freddy Adam, winner on Langhorne Speedway

See also
Frederick Adams (disambiguation)